The Gauss Centre for Supercomputing (GCS) combines the three national supercomputing centres HLRS (High Performance Computing Center Stuttgart), JSC (Jülich Supercomputing Centre), and LRZ (Leibniz Supercomputing Centre, Garching near Munich) into Germany’s Tier-0 supercomputing institution. Each GCS member centre host supercomputers well beyond the 10 Petaflops performance mark. Concertedly, the three centres provide the largest and most powerful supercomputing infrastructure in all of Europe to serve a wide range of industrial and research activities in various disciplines. They also provide top-class training and education for the national as well as the European High Performance Computing (HPC) community.

GCS is the German member of PRACE (Partnership for Advance Computing in Europe), an international non-profit association consisting of 25 member countries, whose representative organizations create a pan-European supercomputing infrastructure, providing access to computing and data management resources and services for large-scale scientific and engineering applications at the highest performance level.

GCS is jointly funded by the Federal Ministry of Education and Research and the federal states of Baden-Württemberg, Bavaria and North Rhine-Westphalia.

GCS has its headquarters in Berlin, Germany.

See also
 TOP500
 Supercomputing in Europe
 eScience

References

External links
Official website

Supercomputer sites
Supercomputers